The Year Is One is the second studio album released by American rock band Comes with the Fall. Guitarist Nico Constantine amicably parted ways with the band before recording began to pursue other interests, however, he is credited for co-writing the music to the opening track "Murder Scene". This is the first album Comes with the Fall recorded as a trio, which has been the lineup ever since.

Reception
Critic David Fricke of Rolling Stone wrote:

Track listing
All music and lyrics by William DuVall, except where noted.

Personnel

Comes with the Fall
Bevan Davies — drums
William DuVall — vocals, guitar
Adam Stanger — bass guitar

Production
Produced by William DuVall
Engineered by Dave Dunn and Russell Fowler, assisted by Howard Karp
Mixed by Russell Fowler and Howard Karp
Mastered by Stephen Marsh
Liner notes – Ken McIntyre
Design – Joe Foster
Artwork and Photography – Jeremy Baile and Darryl Schiff

References

2001 albums
Comes with the Fall albums